From 1906 to 1926, the Finnish Swimming Federation did not arrange a dedicated national competition, but spread out the hosting duties of the championship events to multiple clubs.

Diving

Men

Plain 
Competed in Tampere on 30–31 July 1910.

Source:

Platform 
Competed in Helsinki on 13 July 1910.

Source:

Springboard 

Competed in Helsinki on 13–14 August 1910.

Source:

Women

Platform 
Competed in Helsinki on 13–14 August 1910.

Source:

Swimming

Men

100 metre freestyle 
Competed in Helsinki on 13 August 1910.

Source:

1000 metre freestyle 
Competed in Vaasa on 23–24 July 1910.

Source:

200 metre breaststroke 
Competed in Pori on 7 August 1910.

Source:

100 metre life saving 
Competed in Pori on 7 August 1910.

Source:

4 × 50 metre freestyle relay 
Competed in Helsinki on 14 August 1910.

Source:

Women

100 metre freestyle 
Competed in Tampere on 31 July 1910.

Source:

Water polo

Men 

Competed in Vaasa on 23–24 July 1910.

The championship was settled by one match, won by Helsingfors Simsällskap 4–1.

Source:

Sources

References 

National swimming competitions
National championships in Finland
Swimming competitions in Finland
1910 in Finnish sport
1910 in water sports
Diving competitions in Finland
Water polo competitions